Jessica Trend (born 1 July 1991) is an Australian rules footballer who played for North Melbourne in the AFL Women's (AFLW) competition. She was also part of Fremantle's squad for a season, but was on the inactive list and didn't play. She also appeared as a contestant in the 2021 Big Brother Australia Season 13.

AFLW career

North Melbourne
Trend was signed by North Melbourne as a free agent during the expansion club signing period in 2018. She made her debut in the club's inaugural match, a 36-point victory over Carlton at North Hobart Oval in the opening round of the 2019 season.

Fremantle/Hawthorn VFLW
In the AFL trade period in August 2020, ahead of the 2021 season, Trend was traded to Fremantle. Later that year however Trend was placed on an inactive list to pursue non-football related opportunities and so returned to Victoria. She joined  in the VFL Women's (VFLW) competition and was made captain of the club for the 2021 season. At the end of the 2021 season, she was delisted by Fremantle.

On April 27, 2021, it was revealed that Trend will be a contestant on the 2021 season of Big Brother Australia where she finished in 11th place after being evicted on day 45 after 41 days in the house.

References

External links 

1991 births
Living people
North Melbourne Football Club (AFLW) players
Australian rules footballers from Victoria (Australia)
Lesbian sportswomen
Australian LGBT sportspeople
LGBT players of Australian rules football
Big Brother (Australian TV series) contestants